Up in Central Park is a Broadway musical with a book by Herbert Fields and Dorothy Fields, lyrics by Dorothy Fields, and music by Sigmund Romberg.  The musical, originally called "Central Park" before Broadway (see image of sheet music), was Romberg's last stage work produced during his lifetime.

Produced by Michael Todd, the Broadway production, staged by John Kennedy, and choreographed by Helen Tamiris, opened on January 27, 1945 at the New Century Theatre, where it ran for 504 performances.  The cast included Noah Beery Sr., Wilbur Evans and Betty Bruce.

The musical is set in the Boss Tweed era of New York City in the 1870s.  Wilbur Evans plays John Matthews, a New York Times reporter investigating the Tweed’s crooked political machine, especially the fraud connected with constructing Central Park.
He falls in love with the daughter of one of the Boss’ ward heelers, who marries a politician, who is killed.  She later rekindles her love for Matthews. The settings, costumes and dances evoked the lithographs of Currier and Ives.

Songs

Act I
 Up from the Gutter
 Carousel in the Park
 It Doesn’t Cost You Anything to Dream
 Boss Tweed
 When She Walks in the Room
 Currier and Ives
 Close as Pages in a Book
 Rip Van Winkle
 The Fireman’s Bride

Act II
 When the Party Gives a Party
 Maypole Dance
 The Big Back Yard
April Snow
Finaletto
The Birds and the Bees

Film version
In 1948 the musical was made into a film directed by William A. Seiter and starring Deanna Durbin, Dick Haymes and Vincent Price. Mary Grant designed the film's costumes. The movie version omits much of the Broadway score and changes the story considerably.  The film was not a success.

Recordings
Decca released an album of eight songs from the show with original cast members Wilbur Evans and Betty Bruce, along with the show orchestra conducted by Max Meth.  Also appearing on the album are Eileen Farrell and Celeste Holm, who were not in the show.

RCA Victor put out an album with Jeanette MacDonald and Robert Merrill singing six selections from the score, with Russell Bennett conducting. (78rpm set M-991, discs 10-1153/4/5)

References

External links
 

1945 musicals
Broadway musicals
Musicals by Sigmund Romberg
Musicals by Herbert Fields
Central Park